Księginki  is a village in the administrative district of Gmina Dolsk, within Śrem County, Greater Poland Voivodeship, in west-central Poland. Lech Walesa spent several weeks here before his union activity in Gdańsk.

References

Villages in Śrem County